Sergiy Klimniuk (sometimes shown as Serhiy Klyminuk, born January 14, 1976) is a Ukrainian sprint canoer who competed in the early 2000s. He won a bronze medal in the C-2 200 m event at the 2003 ICF Canoe Sprint World Championships in Gainesville.

Klimniuk also finished eighth in the C-2 500 m event at the 2000 Summer Olympics in Sydney.

References

Sports-reference.com profile

1976 births
Canoeists at the 2000 Summer Olympics
Living people
Olympic canoeists of Ukraine
Ukrainian male canoeists
ICF Canoe Sprint World Championships medalists in Canadian
21st-century Ukrainian people